Aleika Castle or Aliqa Castle is located in Aliqa near Tartus at distance 85 km, it consists of two floor structures, a type of concentric castle. Historically (12th century) it was under Syrian Nizari Isma'ili control, and had part during the crusades. Cemetery stones are found in the castle with Latin inscriptions, which confirms that fights took place here during the Crusades. The Mamluk Sultan Baibars is mentioned in the archives of the Syrian Tourism ministry.

See also
List of castles in Syria
List of Ismaili castles

References

Castles in Syria